Eugenio Castro (born 1 July 1971) is a Cuban former cyclist. He competed in the team pursuit at the 1992 Summer Olympics.

References

External links
 

1971 births
Living people
Cuban male cyclists
Olympic cyclists of Cuba
Cyclists at the 1992 Summer Olympics
Place of birth missing (living people)
Pan American Games medalists in cycling
20th-century Cuban people
Pan American Games gold medalists for Cuba
Medalists at the 1991 Pan American Games